Stefano Pecci (born 10 May 1979) is an Italian modern pentathlete. He represented Italy at the 2000 Summer Olympics held in Sydney, Australia in the men's modern pentathlon and he finished in 13th place.

In 2004, at the 2004 World Modern Pentathlon Championships held in Moscow, Russia, he won the bronze medal in the men's team event, alongside Andrea Valentini and Enrico dell'Amore.

In 2016, he was a candidate for the board of the European Confederation of Modern Pentathlon (ECMP) but he did not receive enough votes to be elected.

References

External links 
 
 

1979 births
Living people
Sportspeople from Rome
Italian male modern pentathletes
Olympic modern pentathletes of Italy
Modern pentathletes at the 2000 Summer Olympics
World Modern Pentathlon Championships medalists